The Wine Festival of Cyprus is an annual festival in Limassol, Cyprus, that celebrates wine and winemaking. Since the first festival in 1961, it is organised annually in late August to early September by the municipality of the city of Limassol at the grounds of the municipal gardens.

References

External links
 Limassol Municipality site
 Limassol Wine Festival at World Events Guide site

Festivals in Cyprus
Limassol
Wine-related events
1961 establishments in Cyprus
Festivals established in 1961
Annual events in Cyprus
Wine festivals
Food and drink festivals in Cyprus
Autumn events in Cyprus